Lake Hart is a census-designated place and an unincorporated area in Orange County, Florida, United States. The population was 542 as of the 2010 census. It is part of the Orlando–Kissimmee Metropolitan Statistical Area.

Geography
Lake Hart is located at  (28.388834, -81.229113).

According to the United States Census Bureau, the CDP has a total area of 4.8 km2 (1.9 mi2), of which 3.5 km2 (1.4 mi2) is land and 1.2 km2 (0.5 mi2) (25.95%) is water.

The CDP does not include the lake of the same name, but abuts it. It does include a smaller lake to the west of Lake Hart, named Lake Whippoorwill.

Demographics

As of the census of 2000, there were 557 people, 227 households, and 155 families residing in the CDP.  The population density was 157.0/km2 (407.0/mi2).  There were 258 housing units at an average density of 72.7/km2 (188.5/mi2).  The racial makeup of the CDP was 94.79% White, 0.54% African American, 0.18% Native American, 1.44% Asian, 1.44% from other races, and 1.62% from two or more races. Hispanic or Latino of any race were 3.95% of the population.

There were 227 households, out of which 23.8% had children under the age of 18 living with them, 59.5% were married couples living together, 5.7% had a female householder with no husband present, and 31.3% were non-families. 21.6% of all households were made up of individuals, and 6.6% had someone living alone who was 65 years of age or older.  The average household size was 2.45 and the average family size was 2.78.

In the CDP, the population was spread out, with 20.3% under the age of 18, 4.3% from 18 to 24, 31.4% from 25 to 44, 31.2% from 45 to 64, and 12.7% who were 65 years of age or older.  The median age was 42 years. For every 100 females, there were 111.8 males.  For every 100 females age 18 and over, there were 112.4 males.

The median income for a household in the CDP was $50,625, and the median income for a family was $55,568. Males had a median income of $36,000 versus $22,361 for females. The per capita income for the CDP was $44,665.  None of the families and 6.9% of the population were living below the poverty line, including no under eighteens and none of those over 64.

References

Unincorporated communities in Orange County, Florida
Census-designated places in Orange County, Florida
Greater Orlando
Census-designated places in Florida
Unincorporated communities in Florida